The Red-Haired Cupid is a 1918 American silent Western comedy film directed by Clifford Smith and starring Roy Stewart, Charles Dorian and Peggy Pearce.

Cast
 Roy Stewart as William 'Red' Saunders 
 Charles Dorian as Kyle Lambert 
 Peggy Pearce as Loys Andres 
 Raymond Griffith as Albert Jones 
 Aaron Edwards as 'Squint-Eye' Lucas 
 Walter Perry as 'Wind-River' Smith

References

Bibliography
 Goble, Alan. The Complete Index to Literary Sources in Film. Walter de Gruyter, 1999.

External links
 

1918 films
1910s Western (genre) comedy films
Films directed by Clifford Smith
American black-and-white films
Triangle Film Corporation films
1918 comedy films
Silent American Western (genre) comedy films
1910s English-language films
1910s American films